Sally Price may refer to:

 Sally Price (anthropologist) (born 1943), American anthropologist
 Sally Price (chemist), professor of chemistry at University College London